Nguyễn Tân Cương is a Vietnamese general, currently serving as Chief of the General Staff and Deputy Minister of Defence. Nguyễn Tân Cương was born in 1966 in Hà Nam Province, joined the Central Committee of the Communist Party of Vietnam in 2016, and served as the Commander of 4th Military Region.

Other positions 
Other positions held included:
 Deputy Commander and Chief of Staff of 4th Military Region (2013–14)
 Commander of 4th Military Region (2014–18)
 Deputy Chief of General Staff (2018–19)
Deputy Minister of Defence (2019–present)
 Chief of the General Staff (2021-present)

Ranks

 Major General (2012)
 Lieutenant General (2016)
 Colonel General (2021)

References

1966 births
Living people
Vietnamese generals
People from Hà Nam Province
Alternates of the 11th Central Committee of the Communist Party of Vietnam
Members of the 12th Central Committee of the Communist Party of Vietnam
Members of the 13th Central Committee of the Communist Party of Vietnam